Pervomaysky is a rural locality (a settlement) in Pochepsky District, Bryansk Oblast, Russia. The population was 833 as of 2010. There are 8 streets.

Geography 
Pervomaysky is located 25 km southwest of Pochep (the district's administrative centre) by road. Vormino is the nearest rural locality.

References 

Rural localities in Pochepsky District